Combine is a city in Dallas and Kaufman counties in the U.S. state of Texas. The population was 2,245 in 2020.

Geography

Combine is located at  (32.588374, –96.515584).

Demographics

As of the 2020 United States census, there were 2,245 people, 691 households, and 608 families residing in the city.

Education 

Combine is served by two school districts: Crandall Independent School District and by Dallas Independent School District. The students in the Crandall portion are zoned to Wilson Elementary School, Crandall Middle School, and Crandall High School, all within the city of Crandall.

The students in the Dallas County portion are zoned to attend Seagoville schools, which are part of the Dallas Independent School District (DISD). The area is within the Board of Trustees District 4; as of 2008 Nancy Bingham represents the district. The schools are:
 Seagoville Elementary School
 Seagoville Middle School
Seagoville High School

Before 2012, students were zoned jointly to Seagoville Elementary School and Central Elementary School, then grades PK–2 and 3–5, respectively. The grade alignments of Seagoville schools changed in 2012 with the opening of Seagoville North Elementary School, and the DISD portion of Combine was rezoned to Seagoville Elementary for grades PK–5.

All of Dallas County (its portion of Combine included) is in the service area of Dallas College (formerly Dallas County Community College). All of Kaufman County (its portion of Combine included) is in the service area of Trinity Valley Community College.

References

External links
 City of Combine official website

Dallas–Fort Worth metroplex
Cities in Texas
Cities in Dallas County, Texas
Cities in Kaufman County, Texas